Gigliotti is a surname. Notable people with the surname include:

 Anthony Gigliotti (1922–2001), American clarinet player and music teacher
 Bobo Gigliotti, fictitious character in Australian film Fat Pizza
 David Gigliotti (born 1985), French footballer
 Donna Gigliotti (born 1955), American film producer
 Emanuel Gigliotti (born 1987), Argentine football forward
 Frank Gigliotti (born 1942), American politician, former member of the Pennsylvania House of Representatives
 Gilbert L. Gigliotti (born 1961), Professor of early American literature
 Guillaume Gigliotti (born 1989), French footballer
 Lupe Gigliotti (1926–2010), Brazilian television, stage and film actress
 Iolanda Gigliotti alias Dalida (1933–1987), French singer, actress and model